The Sars International Centre for Marine Molecular Biology is a research establishment located at Bergen in Norway.

History
Sars International Centre for Marine Molecular Biology was established in April 1997. It is located at the Bergen High Technology Centre and is funded by the Research Council of Norway, the Ministry of Education and Research and the University of Bergen. It was named after Norwegian father and son marine biologists, Michael Sars (1805–1869) and Georg Ossian Sars (1837–1927).

Organisation
Research at the Sars Centre is undertaken by about eight groups at a time, each working for a period of six years which can be extended at the discretion of an international advisory committee. Each group is led by a group leader, employed for the period of the project, and undertakes basic research into the "comparative molecular biology of marine animals". The Sars Centre is affiliated with the European Molecular Biology Laboratory with which it exchanges scientific information about areas of common interest.

Facilities
The Sars Centre is well equipped for microscopy and imaging and owns a confocal microscope. It also makes use of facilities provided by the University of Bergen, including its marine station at Espegrend. It shares ownership of several vessels and a remotely operated underwater vehicle with the Norwegian Institute of Marine Research.

Research
Research at the Sars Centre involves using marine animals as model organisms to study development using molecular techniques, most often in an evolutionary context, including analysis of the genomes of the species studied. Species studied include the tunicates  Oikopleura dioica and Ciona intestinalis, the sea anemone Nematostella vectensis and various protostomes particularly spiralians.

References

External links
 

Molecular biology institutes